Alex McEwan (born 19 July 1977) is an Australian short track speed skater. He competed at the 2002 Winter Olympics and the 2006 Winter Olympics.

References

External links
 

1977 births
Living people
Australian male short track speed skaters
Olympic short track speed skaters of Australia
Short track speed skaters at the 2002 Winter Olympics
Short track speed skaters at the 2006 Winter Olympics
Sportspeople from Melbourne